Lee Euddeum (born 2 September 1989) is a South Korean footballer who plays as defender for Gwangju FC in K League 1.

Career
He was selected by FC Anyang in the 2013 K League draft.

References

External links 

1989 births
Living people
Association football defenders
South Korean footballers
FC Anyang players
Gwangju FC players
Asan Mugunghwa FC players
K League 1 players
K League 2 players